Tenerife Amigos del Baloncesto, more commonly known by its sponsorship name Tenerife Nº1 was a professional basketball club based in Santa Cruz de Tenerife, Spain.

History
Tenerife AB was founded on 1986 with the aim to professionalize the basketball section of the classic team RC Náutico de Tenerife. In the 1987–88 season, the club promoted to Liga ACB where it played two seasons until its relegation.

The club was folded in 1994 when it merged with the old CB Canarias to create the CB Tenerife Canarias, which it only played two seasons in the new-creation Liga EBA.

Season by season

Notable players

 Tony Dawson
 Lemone Lampley
 Bobby Lee Hurt

References
Profile at Eskudoteka

 
Defunct basketball teams in Spain
Former Liga ACB teams
Basketball teams established in 1986
Basketball teams disestablished in 1994
Basketball teams in the Canary Islands
Sport in Santa Cruz de Tenerife